Lin Haiyin (18 March 1918 – 1 December 2001) was a Taiwanese writer. She is best known for her 1960 book My Memories of Old Beijing, a novelistic tribute to her childhood reminiscences of Beijing.

Biography
Lin was born in Osaka, Japan, where her father (of Toufen, Miaoli County origin) worked as a merchant. Lin's parents moved back to Taiwan briefly, then settling in Beijing when she was 5. She spent her next 25 years there. In Beijing, Lin graduated from the News and Broadcast Institute and became a journalist for Shijie Ribao ("World News Daily").

In 1948, Lin moved with her husband and family to Taiwan, where she became the editor of several important literary periodicals and newspapers, including the literary section of the United Daily News and The Literary Monthly, before eventually establishing her own publishing house. She would reside in Taiwan for the rest of her life.

Altogether, she published some 18 books, including novels, short story collections, radio drama and children's literature, many of which deal with the feminine experience. Her most famous book remains My Memories of Old Beijing (1960). In it, Lin records in lively, evocative, first-person prose her childhood memories, ending with the death of her father, from the eyes of a precocious, impressionable young girl.

Film adaptation
In 1982, mainland Chinese director Wu Yigong made the film My Memories of Old Beijing based on her novel. The film won the Best Director Prize at the 3rd annual Golden Rooster Awards, as well as the Golden Eagle Prize (Best Feature Film) at the Manila International Film Festival in 1983. In 1999, it was chosen as one of the 100 best 20th-century Chinese-language films by Asia Weekly.

Works
Bibliography of Lin Haiyin's works available in English:
"Buried With the Dead." Tr. Jane Parish Yang. The Chinese Pen (Winter, 1980): 33–61. 
"Candle." In Nieh Hua-ling, ed. and trans., Eight Stories By Chinese Women. Taipei: Heritage Press, 1962, 53–68. Also in Ann C. Carver and Sung-sheng Yvonne Chang, eds., Bamboo Shoots After the Rain: Contemporary Stories by Women Writers of Taiwan. NY: The Feminist Press, 1990, 17–25. 
"The Desk." Tr. Nancy Zi Chiang. The Chinese Pen (Winter, 1972): 13–19.
"Donkey Rolls." Tr. David Steelman. The Chinese Pen, (Autumn, 1979): 18–39. 
"Gold Carp's Pleated Skirt." Tr. Hsiao Lien-ren. In Chi Pang-yuan, et al., eds., An Anthology of Contemporary Chinese Literature. Taipei: National Institute for Compilation and Translation, 1975, II, 9–23. 
Green Seaweed and Salted Eggs. Tr. Nancy C. Ing. Taipei: The Heritage Press, 1963. 
"Let Us Go and See the Sea." Tr. Nancy Chang Ing. The Chinese Pen, (Spring, 1973): 32–66. Republished in Chinese Women Writers' Association, eds., The Muse of China: A Collection of Prose and Short Stories. Taipei: Chinese Women Writers' Association, 1974, 61–94. Also in Green Seaweed and Salted Eggs. 
"Lunar New Year's Feast." Tr. Hsin-sheng C. Kao. In Joseph S.M. Lau, ed., The Unbroken Chain: An Anthology of Taiwan Fiction Since 1926. Bloomington: IUP, 1983, 68–73. 
My Memories of Old Beijing. Tr. Nancy Ing and Chi Pang-yuan. HK: Chinese University Press, 1992. Excerpted as "Memories of Old Peking: Huian Court." Tr. Cathy Poon. Renditions, 27–28 (1987): 19–48.

References

Portrait 
    Lin Haiyin. A Portrait by Kong Kai Ming at Portrait Gallery of Chinese Writers (Hong Kong Baptist University Library).

1918 births
2001 deaths
Writers from Osaka
People from Jiaoling
Taiwanese women novelists
Taiwanese novelists
20th-century novelists
20th-century women writers